Zárate Partido is a partido of Buenos Aires Province in Argentina.

External links
Zarate Digital (Spanish)
Zarate On Line (Spanish)

1854 establishments in Argentina
Partidos of Buenos Aires Province